Protein MON2 homolog is a protein that in humans is encoded by the MON2 gene.

References

Further reading